FC Dynamo Perm was a Russian football team from Perm. It played professionally in 1946 and from 1993 to 2002. Their best result was 3rd place in Zone Ural in the Soviet Second League in 1946.

Team name history
 1946: FC Dynamo Molotov (Perm was called Molotov at the time)
 1993–2002: FC Dynamo Perm

External links
  Team history at KLISF

Association football clubs established in 1946
Association football clubs disestablished in 2003
Defunct football clubs in Russia
Sport in Perm, Russia
1946 establishments in Russia
2003 disestablishments in Russia